Arndt von Haeseler (born 28 February 1959) is a German bioinformatician and evolutionary biologist. He is the scientific director of the Max F. Perutz Laboratories at the Vienna Biocenter and a professor of bioinformatics at the University of Vienna and the Medical University of Vienna.

Education 
Arndt von Haeseler obtained a doctorate in mathematics from the University of Bielefeld in 1988 under the supervision of Andreas Dress and Hans-Georg Carstens. He habilitated in 1994 at the Department of Zoology of the University of Munich, where he remained as a lecturer until 1998.

Research and career 
From 1998 until 2001, von Haeseler was a group leader at the Max Planck Institute for Evolutionary Anthropology in Leipzig. From 2001 until 2005, he was professor of bioinformatics at the University of Düsseldorf. He was a group leader in bioinformatics at Forschungszentrum Jülich. In 2005, he joined the Max F. Perutz Laboratories (MFPL) in Vienna, where he leads the Center for Integrative Bioinformatics Vienna (CIBIV). In 2017, he became the scientific director of the MFPL. He is a professor of bioinformatics at the University of Vienna and the Medical University of Vienna. At the University Vienna, he is the dean of the Center for Molecular Biology. At the Medical University of Vienna, he is the head of the Department for Medical Biochemistry.

His research focuses on developing computational methods for the reconstruction of phylogenetic trees. He co-authored the phylogenetics software packages TREEFINDER, TREE-PUZZLE, and its successor, IQ-TREE.

He sits on the editorial boards of Molecular Biology and Evolution and BMC Evolutionary Biology.

Awards and honours 
In 2015, von Haeseler was elected as a corresponding member of the mathematics and science class of the Austrian Academy of Sciences.

Since 1999, he holds an honorary professorship in theoretical biology at the University of Leipzig.

References

External links 
 

1959 births
Living people
German bioinformaticians
20th-century German mathematicians
20th-century German biologists
Academic staff of the University of Vienna
Bielefeld University alumni
21st-century German mathematicians
Scientists from Bremen